The 2008–09 Boston Bruins season was the Bruins' 85th season in the National Hockey League (NHL). Their regular season began on the road on October 9, 2008, in Denver versus the Colorado Avalanche and concluded on April 12, 2009, against the New York Islanders. The Bruins looked to improve upon the accomplishments of the 2007–08 season, which included Boston's return to the Stanley Cup Playoffs for the first time since the 2003–04 season.

Marc Savard again led the team in scoring for the regular season, his 88 points good for ninth in the league. Tim Thomas led all goaltenders in both save percentage and goals against at season's end, while sophomore sensation David Krejci led the league in plus-minus, narrowly beating out rookie teammate Blake Wheeler.

The Bruins claimed their first division title since 2004 and clinched top seed in the East for the first time since 2002.

Season events

Arguably the two biggest events to occur during the Bruins' off-season were the acquisition of Montreal Canadiens forward Michael Ryder, a noted 30-goal scorer, and Blake Wheeler, a promising 21-year-old from the University of Minnesota. Twelve-year veteran Stephane Yelle was another strong addition to the roster. Added to a line-up featuring young stars such as Phil Kessel and Milan Lucic, the return of Patrice Bergeron, the improved goaltending of veteran Tim Thomas and coming off the back of an impressive post-season, expectations were high for the team.

Preseason
The Bruins pre-season saw the team compete in eight games over a two-week period. The team played two games each against the Montreal Canadiens, the New York Islanders, the Washington Capitals and the defending Stanley Cup champions, the Detroit Red Wings. Boston maintained a 3–4–1 record through the pre-season with victories against the Canadiens, Capitals and Red Wings, including an impressive 8–3 victory over arch-rivals Montreal in their first match-up.

October
On October 9, the Bruins opened their regular season against the Colorado Avalanche, at the Pepsi Center. The Bruins notched a 5–4 victory and celebrated the return of centre Patrice Bergeron, playing his first NHL game in almost a year, while Blake Wheeler scored his first NHL goal on debut. The team would go on to lose its next two games, including a shootout loss to their rivals, the Montreal Canadiens.

The Bruins home opener took place on October 20, with the team suffering another shootout defeat, this time to the Pittsburgh Penguins. Boston secured its first home victory of the season on October 25, against the Atlanta Thrashers in what proved to be a memorable game, with the teams switching ends at the first stoppage in play after the 10-minute mark of the period due to incorrect markings on the West End (visitors bench side) of the TD Banknorth Garden ice. Winger Milan Lucic recorded his first NHL hat trick in the game, also adding an assist in the 5–4 victory.

On October 27, in Edmonton in overtime and October 28 in Vancouver, Tim Thomas became the first Boston goaltender with consecutive shutouts since April 3–5, 1999 (Byron Dafoe), and only the second goaltender in NHL history to record consecutive 1–0 shutouts on the road (Florida's Craig Anderson, March 2–4, 2008).

The Bruins ended October with a loss to the Calgary Flames on the road, and finished the month with a 5–3–3 record.

November–December

The Bruins opened the month of November with a 5–1 victory at home, in what proved to be a particularly physical match against the Dallas Stars. The game would prove a turning point for the team, with many players citing it as the catalyst that would see the team go on to win their next 12 games at home. One of those wins was a convincing 6–1 victory over the Montreal Canadiens on November 13. This would spark a winning streak against the Canadiens similar to that of the streak that Montreal had against the Bruins in the previous season.

On November 6, in a 5–2 victory against the Toronto Maple Leafs, Blake Wheeler recorded his first NHL hat trick, while Captain Zdeno Chara celebrated his 700th NHL game. In the return leg, on November 17, Matt Hunwick scored his first NHL goal as the Bruins once again defeated the Maple Leafs. Two days later, Marc Savard would secure his 600th NHL point with a goal and three assists in the Bruins' 7–4 win against the Buffalo Sabres. On December 18, centre David Krejci recorded his first NHL hat trick in an 8–5 win against Toronto. Phil Kessel also scored two goals in the match, his second bringing up his 100th career point.

Boston finished the month of November with an 11–1–1 record, including an 8–0–0 record at home. They would carry that form through the month of December, finishing with a remarkable 12–1–0 record and remaining undefeated at TD Garden (4–0–0). Phil Kessel maintained an 18-game point streak from November 13 to December 21, the longest such streak overall for the season and equalling Ed Olczyk's record for the longest point streak by an American-born player in NHL history. The biggest concern during this period was the loss of forward Patrice Bergeron, the young centre sustaining his second concussion in 14 months, after a heavy collision with the Carolina Hurricanes' Dennis Seidenberg. Bergeron would go on to miss the next 15 games.

January
Boston would begin 2009 in the same manner with which they ended 2008 – with a victory over the defending Eastern Conference champions, the Pittsburgh Penguins. The victory, their 10th in a row and 14th-straight at home, secured the team's longest streak since March 9–28, 1973, and catapulted the Bruins to the top spot in the NHL with 62 points, one more than the San Jose Sharks.

From January 12 to 29, forward Phil Kessel was sidelined with mononucleosis. On January 13, Marco Sturm was lost for the season after undergoing surgery for an injury incurred on December 18 against the Toronto Maple Leafs. On January 27, Patrice Bergeron would make his second return from concussion in as many seasons, tallying an assist in the Bruins 3–2 overtime victory against the Washington Capitals. On January 31, Tuukka Rask, recalled from the Providence Bruins, played his first game with the Bruins for the season and recorded his first NHL shutout, stopping all 35 shots in a 1–0 victory against the New York Rangers.

All-Star weekend

Three Bruins were assigned to the Eastern Conference for the 57th National Hockey League All-Star Game, with Zdeno Chara, Marc Savard and Tim Thomas all representing Boston as reserves. Coach Claude Julien was also named as head coach ahead of Montreal counterpart, Guy Carbonneau. Over the course of the weekend, Blake Wheeler was named MVP of the YoungStars game with a four-goal performance, Zdeno Chara recorded the hardest ever shot (105.4 mph) in the SuperSkills Competition, while Chara, Savard and Thomas celebrated victory in the All-Star Game, with Savard tallying three assists while Thomas was awarded the win for his efforts in both the overtime and shootout periods.

March
On March 4, the Bruins acquired defenseman Steve Montador from the Anaheim Ducks in exchange for forward Petteri Nokelainen. Later that day, the club announced the acquisition of forward Mark Recchi and a second round draft pick in the 2010 NHL Entry Draft from the Tampa Bay Lightning in exchange for defenseman Matt Lashoff and forward Martins Karsums. Three days later, on March 7, Recchi scored a pair of goals in his second outing for the Bruins, against the Chicago Blackhawks.

The Bruins secured their second successive playoff berth on March 21, when the Florida Panthers lost to the Columbus Blue Jackets. The following night, they secured the Northeast Division title with a 4–1 victory against Eastern rivals the New Jersey Devils.

April
On April 2, against the Ottawa Senators, Boston recorded their 50th win for the season, the eighth time in franchise history and first since 1992–93 that the mark had been achieved. Prior to the match, David Krejci was the recipient of NESN's Seventh Player Award, the annual award presented to the Bruin who went above and beyond the call of duty and exceed the expectations of Bruins fans during the season.

Standings

Divisional standings

Conference standings

Schedule and results

Preseason

Regular season

The Bruins allowed only 190 goals (excluding 6 shootout goals), the fewest among all 30 teams.

Stanley Cup playoffs

The Bruins clinched a playoff spot for the second consecutive season, securing top seed in the Eastern Conference in the process and gaining home-ice advantage through the first three rounds.

Eastern Conference Quarterfinals
Boston played the eighth-seeded Montreal Canadiens in the first round of the playoffs. Boston had previously lost to Montreal in three consecutive playoff appearances and had not won a playoff series overall in the previous ten seasons.

The Bruins won the first game of the series 4–2, with goals from Phil Kessel, David Krejci and a powerplay winner from Zdeno Chara. In Game 2, Marc Savard had two goals and an assist, while Chuck Kobasew, Shane Hnidy – named as a replacement for the injured Matt Hunwick – and Michael Ryder also scored as the Bruins won 5–1. Milan Lucic was suspended for Game 3 after receiving a match penalty in the closing stages of game two for striking Montreal's Maxim Lapierre in the head with his stick. Boston then travelled to Montreal for Game 3, where they secured another 4–2 victory with goals by Kessel, Ryder, Kobasew and Shawn Thornton. They completed the sweep by winning Game 4, Michael Ryder posting two goals and an assist in the 4–1 victory as the Bruins advanced to the semi-finals for the first time since the 1998–99 season. This marked only the third time that Boston had swept Montreal in the playoffs in history, and the first time since 1992. The only time Boston swept Montreal in the playoffs and closed out the series in Montreal was in 1929, and that season, Boston went on to win the Stanley Cup.

Eastern Conference semifinals
Boston faced the Carolina Hurricanes, a franchise which carried the legacy of Boston's longtime rival the Hartford Whalers.  Prior to the Bruins' first-round sweep of Montreal, their most recent playoff series victory had been against Carolina in April 1999.

The Bruins extended their 5-game winning streak with a 4–1 victory in Game 1, but Carolina stormed back on the strength of an aggressive forecheck and excellent goaltending from Cam Ward. Ward's shutout in Game 2, and Jussi Jokinen's game-winning goals in the next two matches, pushed the Bruins to the brink of elimination. Boston recovered for consecutive wins to push the series to a pivotal seventh game, but the Hurricanes prevailed in overtime of the final contest.

The series-winning goal was scored by Scott Walker, who earlier in the series had avoided punishment for an undefended punch to the face of former Hurricane Aaron Ward. Walker had been due for an automatic suspension, but that penalty was overturned by the NHL after a brief meeting in which he claimed to have thought Ward was prepared to fight. Ward disputed that account and publicly reprimanded the NHL for failing to follow through with a full investigation. In addition, Walker's wife received a diagnosis of cervical cancer midway through the series, lending an additional element of personal drama to his performance. After the series, Walker took public responsibility for striking Ward and expressed relief that his wife's cancer was treatable.

Playoff log

Scorer of game-winning goal in italics

Player statistics

Skaters
Note: GP = Games played; G = Goals; A = Assists; Pts = Points; +/- = Plus-minus; PIM = Penalty minutes

†Denotes player spent time with another team before joining Bruins. Stats reflect time with the Bruins only.
‡Denotes player was traded mid-season.
(G)Denotes goaltender.

Goaltenders
Note: GPI = Games Played In; MIN = Minutes played; GAA = Goals against average; W = Wins; L = Losses; OT = Overtime/shootout losses; SO = Shutouts; SA = Shots Against; GA = Goals against; SV% = Save percentage

Awards and records

Milestones

The Bruins' 5–1 win against the Carolina Hurricanes, on February 17, 2009, was the 200th NHL winning game coached, for current Bruins coach Claude Julien.
The Bruins' 5–4 overtime win against the Montreal Canadiens, on April 9, 2009, was the 400th NHL game coached, for current Bruins coach Claude Julien.

Awards

On April 4, prior to the game against the New York Rangers, the team announced its award winners for the season.

Transactions
Trades

Free agents

Claimed from waivers

Draft picks
Boston's picks at the 2008 NHL Entry Draft in Ottawa, Ontario.

Affiliates
American Hockey League – Providence Bruins (standings)
Johnny Boychuk was selected as a starter for Team Canada in the 2009 AHL All Star Classic. Martins Karsums was selected as a reserve for the PlanetUSA team. Both players were under two-way NHL contracts and played games with Boston during the season. In the game, Karsums, named as a late starter, scored two goals and three assists.

References

Boston Bruins seasons
Boston Bruins
Boston Bruins
Boston Bruins
Boston Bruins
Bruins
Bruins